The Seventh-day Adventist educational system, part of the Seventh-day Adventist Church, is overseen by the General Conference of Seventh-day Adventists located in Silver Spring, Maryland. The educational system is a Christian school-based system.

The Seventh-day Adventist Church has associations with a total of 8,515 educational institutions operating in over 100 countries around the world with over 1.95 million students worldwide. The denominationally-based school system began in the 1870s. The church supports holistic education:

Education by level

Primary 
There are 5,915 Primary Schools worldwide (June 2018 report).
Enrollment: over 1.2 million students.

Secondary 
There are more than 2,435 Secondary Schools worldwide (June 2018 report).
Enrollment: More than 603,000 students.

Tertiary 

The Adventist Church, usually through Union-level administrative units, is associated with post secondary educational institutions around the world, including training institutes, junior colleges and four-year universities, and medical schools, including those associated with Adventist hospitals. Number of Tertiary Institutions (worldwide): 115. Enrollment (worldwide): more than 145,000.

Education by area

North America 
The North American Division Office of Education coordinates with 1,049 schools with 65,000 students in the United States, Canada, and Bermuda.

See also
List of Seventh-day Adventist secondary schools
List of Seventh-day Adventist colleges and universities

References

Sources
 
 Steve Daily, "My Dream for Adventist Higher Education". Adventist Today 8 (Jan–Feb 2000), p18–19

External links 
 Seventh-day Adventist Church Department of Education
 North American Division of Seventh-day Adventists Office of Education
 A Statement on Theological and Academic Freedom and Accountability, voted in 1987
 

 
History of the Seventh-day Adventist Church